Trevor White is a Canadian and British actor working in theatre, film, television and voice since 1994, based in London, England since 2001.

Early and personal life
White is fluent in French and Spanish, and performs both in his native Canadian, as well as an English accent.

In 2013, he married actress Eleanor Matsuura. They had their first child in 2017.

Career
Trevor White is a British and Canadian actor, based in London. Film and TV credits include: Industry, I Hate Suzie, Doctor Who, The Dark Knight Rises, Downton Abbey, Jason Bourne, World War Z, Die Another Day, and Burton & Taylor. He has had recurring roles on The Durrells, Millennium, Episodes, Hunted, and X Company. On stage, he has played Hotspur in Henry IV, and Tullus Aufidius in Coriolanus, for the Royal Shakespeare Company. White also played James Tyrone Jr. in the critically acclaimed 2012 West End production of Eugene O'Neill's Long Day's Journey Into Night, which won the 2013 Olivier Award for Best Revival. White was recently cast as Harry Potter in the Canadian Premiere of Harry Potter and the Cursed Child, opening 2022 in Toronto. White is also a regular in the Assassin's Creed franchise, and has voiced dozens of other video games, including Star Wars: Battlefront, Mass Effect: Andromeda, The Division, and LittleBigPlanet 2. He was also the award-winning voice of Frank Honey in Lego City Undercover, as well as being nominated for his work as Phoenix Wright in Professor Layton vs. Phoenix Wright: Ace Attorney.

In 2018, he played James Blake the bus driver whom Rosa Parks defied in 1955, prompting the Montgomery bus boycott in the critically acclaimed episode "Rosa", the third episode of the eleventh season of the BBC series Doctor Who.

Filmography

Film

Radio

Television

Video games

References

External links

1970 births
Living people
Canadian male film actors
Canadian male stage actors
Canadian male television actors
Canadian male video game actors
Canadian male voice actors
Queen's University at Kingston alumni
Canadian expatriates in England
20th-century Canadian male actors
21st-century Canadian male actors